is a Japanese rock power trio formed in 2004. The group consists of Iyori Shimizu (lead vocals and guitar), Kazuya Kojima (bass guitar and backing vocals), and Hisashi Kurihara (drums). The group signed to independent record label Idolsmith Recordings in 2009 and released their debut EP  (2009) and studio album  (2010). They signed to Universal Sigma in 2011.

Their first compilation album, Encore (2016), reached number one on the Billboard Japan Hot Album for two consecutive weeks in 2016 and also ranked number five on the Oricon yearly best-selling album chart of 2017. In 2018, back number successfully held a Dome Tour titled “stay with you”, including a 2-night-concert in Tokyo Dome. All tickets for 5 concerts are sold out within 2 hours, mobilized over 45,000 guests per concert.

Members
Current members
 Iyori Shimizu – lead vocals, guitar 
 Kazuya Kojima – bass guitar, backing vocals 
 Hisashi Kurihara – drums 

Former members
 Makio Saito – drums, backing vocals

History 
In 2004, the band was formed by Iyori Shimizu in Gunma prefecture. The band was named "back number" because of a girl who had dated Shimizu in high school, dated another bandman. To her, Shimizu is an ex-boyfriend, a "back number". He wanted to make a "cooler" band than that guy's band with a hope that the girl might come back to him. It took two years for the band to come to shape with other members (not the current members) in line. Then some disagreements were born and other members' work priorities got in the way. The person who was in charge of the bass at that time wanted to quit and then joined Kazuya Kojima, who is a childhood friend of Shimizu and is now the current bassist. With Kojima joining, the band's activities were continued but this time, it was the drummer who wanted to withdraw from the band. While looking for another drummer, Shimizu heard that the band of the guy who had taken his girlfriend had disbanded. Hisashi Kurihara, who was the drummer of that band and also went to the same high school as Kazuya, was recruited into back number and has been in charge of the drum since then. After that, the guitarist withdrew and the band was left with its current line-up till now.

In November 2004, the band first performed live at Isezaki DUSTBOWL.

Since 2005, voluntary live performances were held annually in November (until 2007), following the release of the demo CD.

In 2007, the band performed a one-man live show, mobilized over 150 people and the tickets were sold out. In the same year, the band was chosen as the semi-best rocker (second place) from more than 100 bands at the band audition "ROCKERS 2007" sponsored by FM Gunma, which is a gateway for the northern Kanto band. It became a topic in the local media.

In April 2008, their regular radio program "PIZZA SMALL WORLD" started broadcasting at the radio station FM TARO for an area of Ota City, Gunma Prefecture (broadcast ended in March 2014). In June 2008, the band won a qualifying competition from among 500 pairs of entries at the Shonan Music Festival Opening Act Audition and secured an appearance at the large outdoor festival Shonan Music Festival Vol. 2. 

On February 18, 2009, the band released their first mini album, Nogashita Sakana, and became HMV push item "HOT PICKS", TOWER RECORDS push item "Tawareko Men" for the first time, selected as power play of FM station and Sony Ericsson CS commercial song, the band then was widely known throughout the country. On May 27, Tawareko, a back number free live with HMV as the co-ownership was held at SHIBUYA-BOXX, and more than 500 people joined, which exceeded the capacity of the regular entry. In June, the band finished a tour at the Ferrari Temple Park Outdoor Stage in Isezaki City with a crowd of 500 people. After that, the band also positively appeared in events such as "SAKAE-SPRING", "MINAMI WHEEL", "TREASURE", "MUSIC CUBE" all over the country, school festival, install alive, etc.

On June 2, 2010, released their first full-length album, Ato no Matsuri.

On April 6, 2011, the band made their major debut with the single "Hanabira".

On September 7, 2013, the band held a one-man live "back number live at Nippon Budokan - stay with us-" at Nippon Budokan.

From April 2014, the band was appointed as a regular personality of Nippon Broadcasting "All Night Nippon" on every Tuesday. On September 14, 2014, at the Yokohama Arena, the first arena performance "love stories tour 2014 - Yokohama love story 2 ~" was held.

On December 15, 2015, their fifth album, Chandelier, reached first place on the Oricon chart for two consecutive weeks.

On December 28, 2016, the band released their own all-time best album, Encore, which reached number one on the Billboard Japan Hot Album for two consecutive weeks.

Discography

Albums

Independent production

Singles

Digital singles

DVD

Live tour 
 Bolded performances are additional performances.

Awards 
 ROCKERS 2007 · Semi Best Rockers (2007)
 4th CD Shop Awards · Finalist Award Super Star (2012)
 5th CD Shop Awards · Finalist Award blues (2013)
 7th CD Shop Awards · Finalist Award Love Story (2015)
SPACE SHOWER MUSIC AWARDS - BEST GROUP ARTIST (2016)
 The 87th Drama Academy Award "Christmas Song" (2016)
 The 58th Japan Record Awards · Excellent Album Award Chandelier (2016)
 DAM annual karaoke request ranking · First place (2016)
 Uta-Net annual lyrics browsing artist ranking: First place (2016)
 8th CD Shop Awards · Finalist Award Chandelier (2017)

Notes

References

External links
 

Japanese alternative rock groups
Japanese pop rock music groups
Japanese musical trios
Musical groups established in 2004
Musical groups from Gunma Prefecture